Fan Zhiqiang (born 22 August 1988) is a Chinese footballer who plays for Tianjin Shengde.

Club career
Fan Zhiqiang would join the Tianjin TEDA youth team at age 15 before being selected to represent Tianjin in the 2009 National Games where in the final group game, Tianjin lost to Beijing, knocking them out of the competition and leaving Fan dissatisfied with the referee’s officiating he chased the referee along with several team mates he was severely fined by the Chinese Football Association and was suspended for two years. Despite being heavily fined and given a two year suspension he still remained with Tianjin TEDA and joined Tianjin Normal University to continue with his studies while also representing their college team and China in the Football at the 2011 Summer Universiade.

After his suspension ended, Fan was promoted to the senior team of Tianjin TEDA and on 2 October 2011 he would make his professional debut in a league game against Changchun Yatai in a 2-1 defeat.

On 27 January 2017, fan joined third tier football club Nantong Zhiyun. He would go on to establish himself as a regular within the team and in the 2018 China League Two season he would help guide to club to a runners-up position and promotion to the second division.

Career statistics

Club statistics

Notes

Honours

Club
Chinese FA Cup: 2011

References

1988 births
Living people
Chinese footballers
Association football forwards
Chinese Super League players
China League Two players
Tianjin Jinmen Tiger F.C. players
Dalian Transcendence F.C. players
Jiangxi Beidamen F.C. players
Nantong Zhiyun F.C. players
21st-century Chinese people